The Iowa State Cyclones women's volleyball team represents Iowa State University (ISU) and competes in the Big 12 Conference of NCAA Division I. The team is coached by  Christy Johnson-Lynch, she is in her 12th year at Iowa State.  The Cyclones play their home matches at Hilton Coliseum on Iowa State's campus.

History

Early years

Iowa State first put together a volleyball squad in 1973 under coach Gloria Crosby.  Initially just playing in regional tournaments and the occasional one-off match, they began participating in the brand new Big Eight tournament in 1976.  Then in 1982 the Big Eight offered volleyball as a full sport including in-season conference play.  The Cyclones struggled to put together competitive squads for most of their early years. Until 1995 they were unable to finish in the top half of the Big Eight.  Jackie Nunez's 1995 team was the first in school history to make the NCAA Tournament to go along with their second-place finish in the conference.

The 1997 transition to the Big 12 did not treat the Cyclones well.  During their first nine seasons as a member of the Big 12, they were only able to win 13 out of 59 matches in conference play.

Christy Johnson-Lynch (2005–present)

The hiring of Christy Johnson-Lynch in 2005 brought new life to the Cyclones as she has taken them to new heights.  She took the Cyclones to the second round of the NCAA tournament in 2006 and has returned every year since.  This includes three Sweet 16 teams and two runs to Elite 8.  She has produced 22 AVCA All-Americans.

Record

Individual awards

All-Americans

See also
List of NCAA Division I women's volleyball programs

References